Kibatalia macgregori is a species of plant in the family Apocynaceae. It is endemic to the Philippines.

References

Flora of the Philippines
macgregori
Taxonomy articles created by Polbot

Critically endangered flora of Asia
Taxobox binomials not recognized by IUCN